Lady Godiva is a 1921 German silent historical film directed by Hubert Moest and starring Hedda Vernon and Eduard von Winterstein.

The film's sets were designed by the art director Hans Dreier.

Plot
As described in a film magazine, Leofric, a cruel earl of England, threatens a cruel death to the father of the beautiful Lady Godiva (Vernon) if she does not agree to marry him. She then suffers indignities because of her determination to be a wife in name only. The people of Coventry plead with her to intervene with her husband after he threatens to burn down their homes. She succeeds, but only on the condition that she ride unclad on a white horse through the town. She does this, but the earl has disregarded the temper of the people. His palace is undermined and collapses, killing all the people inside. Lady Godiva, warned by the court jester, escapes before the catastrophe, and is reunited with her love, the architect.

Cast

Reception
The film was distributed in the United States in 1922, but was barred from the United Kingdom by the British Board of Film Classification.

References

Bibliography
 Bock, Hans-Michael & Bergfelder, Tim. The Concise CineGraph. Encyclopedia of German Cinema. Berghahn Books, 2009.

External links

1921 films
1920s historical films
German historical films
Films of the Weimar Republic
German silent feature films
Films directed by Hubert Moest
Films set in England
Films set in Coventry
Films set in the 11th century
Lady Godiva
German black-and-white films
Films based on works by Alfred, Lord Tennyson
1920s German films